The 11th Asia Pacific Screen Awards were held on 23 November 2017 at the Brisbane Conventions and Exhibition Centre in Brisbane, Australia.

On 14 September 2017, three jury members were announced in Beijing by the Lord Mayor of Brisbane, Cr Graham Quirk. They are Chinese actress He Saifei, Filipino writer/director Adolfo Alix Jr and Kazakh writer, director and cinematographer Adilkhan Yerzhanov. Top Australian film editor, Jill Bilcock ASE ACE was later announced as the head of the international jury, joined by Yoshi Yatabe, the programming director of the Tokyo International Film Festival, completing the jury line-up. The international jury determined the winners of all the major APSA awards including Best Feature Film, Achievement in Directing, Achievement in Cinematography, Best Screenplay, Best Performance by an Actress and Actor. They also determined the winner of the Cultural Diversity Award, under the patronage of UNESCO.

Haifaa Al Mansour, was announced to be the chair of the Youth Animation and Documentary Jury, followed by Melanie Coombs and Steve Abbott.

Winners and nominees 
Nominees of Youth, Animation, and Documentary were announced with the jury on 4 October 2017. The full list of nominees were announced on 13 October 2017.

Multiple wins and nominations 
The following films received multiple nominations

References 

Asia Pacific Screen Awards
Asia Pacific Screen Awards
Asia Pacific Screen Awards
Asia Pacific Screen Awards